Sheikh Khalifa bin Hamad bin Khalifa Al Thani (born 11 November 1991), known as K.H.K, is the current Qatari minister of the interior, a Qatari royal and prominent car collector.

Education
In 2011, Al Thani began studying in Los Angeles, California at Los Angeles Mission College, a community college. He lived in the Beverly Wilshire Hotel. According to the Los Angeles Times, the prince's handlers sought to get him accepted into UCLA by suggesting that the school would receive a substantial donation. They next sought to get him accepted into the University of Southern California (USC). A couple months after a meeting between Al Thani's mother, Sheikha Moza bint Nasser and USC President C. L. Max Nikias, Al Thani was studying at USC as a transfer student.

Al Thani received a bachelor's and master's degree from USC. In July 2020, the Los Angeles Times published an investigative report showing that he was allowed to skip classes as an undergraduate student for dubious "security reasons", and that he obtained his master's during a period in which he never set foot on campus. During his master's, Al Thani got a "special dispensation" to study remotely, which USC has never before or after offered to any other student. At the same time that he was enrolled in the master's, social media posts showed him attending a handful of military exercises as well as vacationing in France, the UK, and Monaco, and Algeria, where he went hunting with falcons. An adjunct professor said that Al Thani's handlers delivered a final paper in a bag that also contained a Rolex watch, which the adjunct returned.

After the 2019 college admissions bribery scandal, which did not involve Al Thani or his family, the Los Angeles Times had received a tip to look into his college degree.

Car collection 
Al Thani, under his nickname KHK, is famous for his flashy car collection. He frequently has his cars shipped by air freight to various cities around the world for vacation, including London, Paris, Los Angeles, and Monaco. He uses the California license plates "KHALIFA" and "KHK" interchangeably on many of his cars. His collection currently includes:

 Bugatti Divo painted in Cast Grey with stripes and interior inspired by the colours of the French flag.
 Bugatti Chiron Super Sport 300+
 Bugatti Chiron painted in Jet Grey with 'KHK‘ embroidered on the seats and an oil painting of the Emir of Qatar on the dashboard.
 Ferrari LaFerrari, 1 of 4 made painted in Bianco Fuji Opaco. Another LaFerrari painted in this colour is owned by Al Thani's brother Joaan bin Hamad bin Khalifa Al Thani.
 Ferrari F12tdf painted in Giallo Triplo Strato
 Ferrari Monza SP painted in Grigio Scuro
 Lamborghini Sián FKP 37, chassis #1 of 63, painted in Viola Mithras
 Porsche 918 Spyder painted in Fashion Grey
 McLaren Speedtail painted in Volcano Red and Nerello Red.
 Lamborghini Countach LPI 800-4 painted in Impact White with 'KHK' embroidered on the interior 
 
Al Thani previously owned a Ferrari LaFerrari painted in yellow, infamously caught on video in 2015 street racing in Beverly Hills, California. The story was covered by local news.

Career 
Al Thani is an officer in the Qatari internal security service. He is also Commander of Security Operations for the 2022 FIFA World Cup.

Al-Duhail SC
In December 2019, Al Thani was elected as the new president of Al-Duhail SC.

References

1991 births
Living people
House of Thani
Qatari politicians
Qatari Muslims
Sons of monarchs